is a Japanese rugby sevens player. He competed at the 2016 Summer Olympics for 's rugby sevens team. He also won a gold medal at the 2014 Asian Games in Incheon, South Korea as a member of the ese squad. He plays in the Top League for Toyota Verblitz.

References

External links 
 JRFU Player Profile
 

1991 births
Living people
People from Aichi Prefecture
Sportspeople from Aichi Prefecture
Male rugby sevens players
Rugby sevens players at the 2016 Summer Olympics
Olympic rugby sevens players of Japan
Japanese rugby sevens players
Japanese rugby union players
Rugby union players at the 2014 Asian Games
Japan international rugby union players
Asian Games medalists in rugby union
Toyota Verblitz players
Asian Games gold medalists for Japan
Medalists at the 2014 Asian Games
Japan international rugby sevens players
Rugby sevens players at the 2020 Summer Olympics
Rugby union wings
Rugby union fullbacks